Mitch Holmberg (born March 9, 1993) is a Canadian ice hockey player. He is currently playing for the Wheeling Nailers of the ECHL.

Playing career
Holmberg played midget hockey with the Sherwood Park Kings in the Alberta Midget Hockey League before he was selected by the Spokane Chiefs in the first round (21st overall) of the 2008 WHL Bantam Draft. After completing his junior eligibility with the Chiefs in the Western Hockey League, Holmberg was signed to an AHL contract for the following 2014–15 season with the Oklahoma City Barons on April 1, 2014. He made his professional debut a day later with the Barons and on April 4 finished his season in the playoffs with ECHL affiliate, the Bakersfield Condors.

On November 20, 2014, Holmberg's AHL rights were traded to the Utica Comets in a transaction between the Vancouver Canucks and Edmonton Oilers. He was later re-assigned by the Comets to ECHL club, the Elmira Jackals for the remainder of the 2014–15 season.

As a free agent, Holmberg signed his first contract abroad, agreeing to a one-year deal with the farm club of Hungarian based, Alba Volán Székesfehérvár on August 24, 2015. After a season in the MOL Liga, Holmberg was unable to debut in the top-flight Székesfehérvár club and opted to return to the ECHL as a free agent in the off-season, signing a one-year deal with the Wichita Thunder on July 28, 2016. In the 2016–17 season, Holmberg contributed with 7 points in 13 games with the Thunder before he was traded to the Colorado Eagles on December 18, 2016. Amongst the Eagles top nine forwards, Holmberg added a further 8 goals in 28 games before he was dealt for a second time within the season, to the Wheeling Nailers on March 9, 2017.

Career statistics

Regular season and playoffs

International

Awards and honors

References

External links 

1993 births
Living people
Bakersfield Condors (1998–2015) players
Canadian ice hockey right wingers
Colorado Eagles players
Edmonton Oilers scouts
Elmira Jackals (ECHL) players
Ice hockey people from Alberta
Oklahoma City Barons players
People from Sherwood Park
Spokane Chiefs players
Wheeling Nailers players
Wichita Thunder players
Canadian expatriate ice hockey players in the United States